Old Fort 157B is an Indian reserve of the Lac La Ronge Indian Band in Saskatchewan.

References

Indian reserves in Saskatchewan
Division No. 18, Saskatchewan